Xiang Hantian (Chinese: 向汉天; born 21 November 1995) is a Chinese football player who currently plays for China League One side Beijing Renhe.

Club career
Xiang Hantian received organized football training with Guizhou Renhe and went to Portugal following Chinese Football Association 500.com Stars Project in the end of 2011. He was promoted to Guizhou Renhe first team squad in 2014. On 22 April 2014, Xiang made his debut for Guizhou Renhe in the last group match of 2014 AFC Champions League against Western Sydney Wanderers. He scored his first goal for the club on 10 July 2015 in a 5-2 win against Shanghai Shenxin.

Career statistics 
Statistics accurate as of match played 31 December 2019.

References

External links
 

1995 births
Living people
Chinese footballers
Footballers from Guizhou
People from Guiyang
Beijing Renhe F.C. players
Chinese Super League players
China League One players
Association football defenders 
Association football midfielders
AD Oeiras players